Paulo Catarino (born 30 September 1963) is a Portuguese long-distance runner. He competed in the men's marathon at the 1988 Summer Olympics.

References

1963 births
Living people
Athletes (track and field) at the 1988 Summer Olympics
Portuguese male long-distance runners
Portuguese male marathon runners
Olympic athletes of Portugal
Place of birth missing (living people)